Francisco Patricio Ugarte Janietz (born 15 December 1986), is a German-Chilean former professional footballer who played as a defender.

Coaching career
Following his retirement, he joined the technical staff of Miguel Ponce in Santiago Wanderers as assistant coach.

Personal life
Born in Germany to a Chilean father and a German mother, he holds dual nationality: German–Chilean. In Spanish, his last name Janietz is known as Nieto.

References

External links
 
 
 Francisco Ugarte at playmakerstats.com (English version of ceroacero.es)
 

1986 births
Living people
People from Nürtingen
Sportspeople from Stuttgart (region)
German people of Chilean descent
Sportspeople of Chilean descent
Chilean people of German descent
Citizens of Chile through descent
Naturalized citizens of Chile
German footballers
Footballers from Baden-Württemberg
Association football defenders
Chilean footballers
Club Deportivo Palestino footballers
Deportes Copiapó footballers
C.D. Arturo Fernández Vial footballers
San Luis de Quillota footballers
Limón F.C. players
TSG Balingen players
FC Tulsa players
Deportes Magallanes footballers
Magallanes footballers
Independiente de Cauquenes footballers
San Antonio Unido footballers
Chilean Primera División players
Primera B de Chile players
Segunda División Profesional de Chile players
Liga FPD players
Regionalliga players
USL Championship players
German expatriate footballers
Chilean expatriate footballers
Expatriate footballers in Chile
German expatriate sportspeople in Chile
Expatriate footballers in Costa Rica
Chilean expatriate sportspeople in Costa Rica
German expatriate sportspeople in Costa Rica
Chilean expatriate sportspeople in Germany
Expatriate footballers in Germany
German expatriate sportspeople in the United States
Chilean expatriate sportspeople in the United States
Expatriate soccer players in the United States
Chilean football managers